Edition 1  is a collaborative studio album by British crossover project King Midas Sound and Christian Fennesz, released on 15 September 2015 on Ninja Tune, with the instrumental version released in conjunction on the digital and CD versions.

Background
Edition 1 was, upon release, intended to be the first in the "Edition" series consisting of similar albums "with collaborators kept under wraps, each one to be a genre-stretching and boundary-pushing surprise, packaged with a conceptual continuity." However, no further albums have been released by the King Midas Sound project in this series, making it a standalone.

Track listing

References

2015 albums
Experimental music albums by English artists
Ambient pop albums